Khachaparakh is a necropolis in the Ordubad District of the Nakhchivan Autonomous Republic of Azerbaijan.

References 

Cemeteries in Azerbaijan
Ordubad District